Petty Enterprises was an American professional stock car racing team that competed in the NASCAR Cup Series. The team, created in 1949 by owner-driver Lee Petty, became the most successful team of the first 50 years of NASCAR. Competing primarily in the Cup Series, the team won 10 Cup Series owners and drivers championships and amassed 268 NASCAR Cup victories, along with 2 Truck Series wins and 3 ARCA Racing Series victories.

Although primarily fielding cars for Lee Petty, Richard Petty, and Kyle Petty, others who drove for the team included Jim Paschal, Buddy Baker, Pete Hamilton, Jimmy Hensley, Bobby Hamilton, John Andretti, Marvin Panch, Jeff Green, and Bobby Labonte. Petty Enterprises scored its last Cup Series win in 1999 and closed after the 2008 season, merging operations with Evernham Motorsports to become Richard Petty Motorsports.

Grand National/Winston Cup Series
Lee Petty competed in the inaugural series race in 1949, crashing out after completing half distance. Lee went on to win 54 races from 1949 to 1961, including the inaugural Daytona 500 in 1959. Richard Petty won 200 races from 1960 to 1984. Of those, 196 wins came with Petty Enterprises, mainly in the No. 43 but also in Nos. 41 and 42 from 1962 to 1966. Petty ran two dirt races for owner Don Robertson in 1970 at Columbia Speedway and North Carolina State Fairgrounds as part of a deal with Petty Enterprises, winning both starts. He moved to newly-formed Curb Racing for 1984 and 1985, winning his last two career races during the 1984 season. After 1983, the team went winless in the series until 1996, when Bobby Hamilton found victory lane. The last two wins for the team came in 1997 with Hamilton and 1999 with John Andretti.

. – Petty Enterprises won driver's championship

Exhibition Races

Wins by driver
Eight drivers won at least one points race for Petty Enterprises in the Cup Series; Lee and Richard Petty combined to win 250 of the 268 races.

Convertible Division
The Petty's ran part-time in the NASCAR Convertible Division from 1957 to 1959, winning three races.

Truck Series
Petty Enterprises fielded an entry in the NASCAR Truck Series from the inaugural season in 1995 to the 2002 season, winning two races with Jimmy Hensley.

ARCA Series
In 1979, Petty fielded Kyle Petty in the ARCA series for a race at Daytona, which he won. In 1998, Adam Petty made two starts for the team, winning once, and in 2007 Chad McCumbee ran at Pocono, winning the race.

Winston West Series
Richard Petty competed in eight Winston West Series races from 1964 to 1984, winning three times at Phoenix International Raceway.

See also
List of NASCAR race wins by Richard Petty
List of NASCAR race wins by Hendrick Motorsports
List of NASCAR race wins by Joe Gibbs Racing

References

Petty, Richard
NASCAR race wins
Petty race wins